St Roch's Football Club is a Scottish football club, based in Royston Road, Glasgow. Nicknamed "the Candy Rock", they were formed in 1920 and play at James McGrory Park. They wear green and white strips.

St Roch's was the first club of Jimmy McGrory, the British record goalscorer with 550 goals. McGrory, who grew up in the Garngad area where the club originated, began playing for them aged just 11. After helping the club win the Scottish Junior Cup in 1922, scoring in the final, he joined Celtic the following season.

Honours
Scottish Junior Cup
Winners: 1921–22

Other honours
Glasgow Junior League winners: 1924–25, 1925–26
Central League champions: 1943–44
Central League B Division winners: 1972–73
Central League C Division winners: 1971–72
Central Division One winners: 1983–84
Central Division Two winners: 1994–95
Glasgow Dryburgh Cup: 1924–25, 1936–37, 1943–44, 1959–60, 1961–62

Stadium
 
St Roch's play at James McGrory Park on Royston Road. Originally called Provanmill Park, the ground was renamed in honour of Jimmy McGrory in 2013.

External links
 Website
 Facebook
 Twitter

References

Football clubs in Scotland
Scottish Junior Football Association clubs
Association football clubs established in 1921
Football clubs in Glasgow
1921 establishments in Scotland
West of Scotland Football League teams
Springburn